Lloydminster Public School Division is a public school authority within the Canadian provinces of Alberta and Saskatchewan operated out of Lloydminster.

See also 
List of school authorities in Alberta

References

External links 

 

Lloydminster
School districts in Alberta
School divisions in Saskatchewan